Yde is a town in the Netherlands. 
Yde or YDE may also refer to:
 Yde (name) 
 Yde Girl, a bog body found in the town of Yde
 Yde et Olive, a thirteenth-century French song
 Yangum language, spoken in Papua New Guinea (by ISO 639 code)
 Paradise River Airport, Canada (by IATA code)
 Young Democrats for Europe
 Actress Breanna Yde, who releases music under the pseudonym YDE